Leucoagaricus nympharum is a species of fungus in the family Agaricaceae.

Taxonomy 
Originally classified as Agaricus nympharum by the Hungarian mycologist Károly Kalchbrenner in 1873 and reclassified as Leucoagaricus nympharum by the French mycologist Marcel Bon in 1977.

Description 
Leucoagaricus nympharum is a large white dapperling mushroom with a distinctive scaly cap which resembles that of Chlorophyllum rhacodes only with a smaller, 4-10cm cap and a more starkly white colour. Despite its distinctive appearance it is seldom recorded and little known.

References 

nympharum
Taxa described in 1873